The Indonesia cricket team toured Japan in October 2022 to play a three-match Twenty20 International (T20I) bilateral series at the Sano International Cricket Ground in Sano against hosts Japan. Both sides played their first official T20I matches since the ICC announced that all matches between its member nations would be eligible for this status. The series provided both teams with preparation for the T20 World Cup East Asia-Pacific sub-regional qualifier.

Japan won the opening match of the series by 65 runs, in what was their first international fixture since December 2018. The hosts secured the series with a 75-run victory in the second match. Indonesia picked up a consolation 3-wicket win in the final match. This win was the first T20I win by Indonesia. Japan's Reo Sakurano-Thomas was named player of the series.

Squads

T20I series

1st T20I

2nd T20I

3rd T20I

References

External links
 Series home at ESPNcricinfo

Associate international cricket competitions in 2022–23